Wild Roses (Polish: Dzikie róże) is a 2017 Polish drama and thriller film directed by Anna Jadowska. The film is set in Oleśnica, Poland.

Plot
Ewa, the film's chief protagonist played by Marta Nieradkiewicz, is a thirty-year-old mother with two children. Her mother (Halina Rasiakówna) is devoted to helping her daughter's caretaking of children. Ewa's husband (Michał Żurawski) works abroad, so that the family can complete the construction of their family home. The movie's dilemma centres around the fragile nature of their long-distance relationship, evidently as the film reaches its disastrous climacteric.

Cast
 Marta Nieradkiewicz as Ewa
 Michał Żurawski as Andrzej
 Halina Rasiakówna as Ewa's mother
 Konrad Skolimowski as Marcel
 Natalia Bartnik as Marysia
 Dominik Weslig as Jaś
 Dominika Biernat as Basia

References

2017 films
2017 thriller drama films
Polish thriller drama films
2010s Polish-language films
2017 drama films